Bicaz-Chei is a commune in Neamț County, Romania. It is composed of four villages: Bicaz-Chei, Bârnadu (Bernádtelep), Gherman and Ivaneș (Iványos). Bicaz-Chei is one of three communes in Neamț County (most of which is in Western Moldavia) that are part of the historic region of Transylvania.

The commune is located in the western part of the county, in the Cheile Bicazului-Hășmaș National Park, on the border with Harghita County. It is crossed by National road , which starts in Gheorgheni, Harghita County, passes by the Red Lake and through the nearby Bicaz Gorge, and then continues east to Bicaz.

References

External links

Communes in Neamț County
Localities in Transylvania